Muhammad Othman Elkhosht (al-khasht) (born 1964) is the president of Cairo University.   He is a professor of philosophy of religion and contemporary philosophy at Faculty of Arts, Cairo University. He is a leading authority on modern Islam, and a member of the Association for Intercultural Philosophy, which encourages a dialogue among philosophers from all over the world. He held several positions including the Vice President of Education and Students Affairs at Cairo University. He is also a member of local and international committees: the Interfaith Dialogue Center in Al-Azhar, the Supreme Council for Islamic Affairs, Awqaf Academy, the Supreme Council of Naif Arab University for Security Sciences (League of Arab States) and the Science and Innovation Committee of Shanghai Jiao Tong University.

Early life and education 
Muhammad Othman Elkhosht was born on 28 March 1964. As a child, Elkhosht was always interested in the Quran.  He participated in many local research and Qur'an competitions and won numerous prizes.

He then joined the Faculty of Arts and chose to become a student at the Department of Philosophy to. Elkhosht always topped his classes during his college years showing great passion for philosophy. As a university student, Elkhosht wrote many books and research that were published. His first book was published while he was still a freshman and was soon followed by more writings that were published by major Egyptian and Lebanese publishing houses, such as Dar Alkitab Alarabi. Whoever read his works at that time would believe that Elkhosht was old and experienced scholar, and not a student.

Following his four years of study, he earned his Master's Degree in Modern and Contemporary Philosophy in 1990 and completed his PhD in 1993.

Philosophy and thought 
Elkhosht is an Arab thinker and an encyclopedia of knowledge; he has delved into both Islamic heritage and Western thought. His writings are characterized by combining the rational approach and his religious background.

His writings are essential references on the fundamentals of religion, modern and contemporary doctrines, and political science, in a sense that has to do with civil society and its role, the global state and the nation state.

Some of Elkhosht’s writings are taught at several universities with regard to the various disciplines of religion: Fundamentals of Religion, Study of Hadith, Sharia (Islamic Law), and Comparative Religion. He has also written many books on Islamic sects as well as social life. Elkhosht’s writings, marked by moderation and rationality, reveal his thorough study of the humanities and legal sciences.

Elkhosht has rewritten the Studies of Hadith in a modern way and re-interpreted the position of Sharia (Islamic Law) on women's issues since the eighties of the twentieth century, with regard to women’s right to take positions in the judiciary, the fatwa (authoritative ruling on a religious issue), taking the stand in court of law, equality between men and women in political and civil rights, etc.

He has an upright stance on issues that have to do with the state, civil society, freedom of expression, and democracy. He has fought corruption and extremism in many of his books and articles, such as Civil Society and the State and Ethics of Progress. Elkhosht has also established philosophical tolerance in his books The Minimal Middle Ground among Religions and Ethics and Civil Society, Diversity and Tolerance in the Islamic Civilization in which he criticizes closed and dogmatic doctrines.

Elkhosht’s works also offer a new vision of the history of western philosophy that goes beyond the traditional conflict, since the beginning of modern times, between rationality and emotions, idealism and realism, formalism and materialism. Moreover, some other messages are generated from Elkhosht’s works to combine the thoughts of Descartes and Bacon, Leibniz and Locke before Kant and Hume, and after Hegel and Marx. He has criticized Descartes’ theological undertones and unraveled his counterfeit rationality. Elkhosht also criticized Leibniz’s resort to theology, Hegel’s absolutism, and Hume’s sensual world and skepticism.

Furthermore, in his books, he calls for spiritual rationality as a methodology and, at the same time, a vision for life. He has managed to distinguish between rational and irrational elements of religions in his book The Reasonable and the Unreasonable in Religions depending on the rational critical approach. There are references to his writings in Western studies and websites. His name is mentioned in those studies as follows: "Muhammad Othman Al-Khasht", "Muhammad Al-Khasht", or "Alkhasht".

Some leading journals in Egypt and the Arab world have published and reviewed his works.

El-Khosht in the eyes of others
Elkhosht’s thought and works triggered various views: 

 The Egyptian philosopher Professor Hassan Hanafi, in his introduction to his book "Mind and Metaphysics", published by Dar Al-Tanweer in Beirut, described Elkhosht saying, “It is as if the soul of Al-Farabi is in Muhammad Osman Elkhosht who belongs to a comprehensive civilization that seeks to unite, instead of dividing, sources of differences. It is also as if Elkhosht is heading for a second reconciliation between Salafism and secularism, in an attempt to bring that bloodshed between brothers, in modern times, to a halt.”
 When Dr. Yasin Abdel Ghaffar, the greatest hepatologist in the Arab world, listened to the twenty-one year old’s Friday sermon (On the Qur'an and Progress), he said: “There is no doubt that Muhammad Osman Elkhosht is a new modern religious scholar who speaks a new language and tackles modern topics with clear rationality. Therefore, he is not like other sheikhs; he is a rational thinker who believes in religion.”
 Sheikh ‘Amer Osman said: “He recites the Qur’an in an extremely accurate way.”
 Sheikh Mahmoud Khalil Al-Hosary commended Elkhosht’s excellent articulation of the sounds of the Qur'an.
 Professor Yahya Howaidy, former Dean of the Faculty of Arts and Islamic thinker, said: “Muhammad Osman Elkhosht is a new model of a philosopher who has managed to offer a new vision of the history of philosophy that has changed the traditional view of modern and contemporary philosophy.”
 The great professor of philosophy Professor Murad Wahba Said, “Despite my difference with Professor Mohamed Osman Elkhosht in ideology, I see that his writings are not research works in philosophy, but they are original philosophical texts based on genuine creativity.”
 Professor Sobhi Saleh, a scientific author and professor of sciences at the University of Alexandria, said, “He has a bright mind.”
 The renowned researcher Mr. Abdul Qadir Ata said: “He is one of the best researchers and he is full of ideas.”
 Abu Abdul Malik Alsakandari, a Salafi scholar, said: “Professor Muhammad Osman Elkhosht is a great researcher and scholar.”
 Sheikh Ibrahim Atwa Awad, a researcher, said: "Muhammad Osman Elkhosht is a researcher and scrutinizer who delves deep into the heritage."

Legacy 
M. O. Elkhosht has written 23 research papers in Arabic and English, published regionally and internationally. He published 57 books by major publishing houses, locally and regionally. He edited 24 Islamic heritage books. His translations include: the Britannica Encyclopedia of religions and the Dictionary of World Religions.

Realizing the importance of his works, Arab and international researchers have written more than 78 research papers about his works and projects  such as: The Intellectual and Methodological Bases in Contemporary Islamic Philosophy: Elkhosht as an Example and The Renewal of Religious Discourse in Elkhosht’s Project.

Elkhosht also supervised several Master and PhD theses tackling the philosophy of religion and the philosophy of politics. Being an authority on modern philosophy, thousands of references are made to his works. Moreover, several theses have been written on his thought and works.

Books and Papers

Comparative Religions and Philosophy of Religion
 Towards the Establishment of a New Religious Era. Cairo: New Book, 2017.
 Struggle of the Spirit and Material in the Age of Reason, Dar Rabiyat, 2017. 
 Encyclopedia of World Religions, Cairo, Cairo University Center for Foreign Languages And Professional Translation, 2013.  
 Development of Religion. Cairo: Shorouk Bookshop, 2010. 
 Hashashin Movement: History and Creeds of the Most Dangerous Secret Sect in the Islamic World, Cairo, Ibn Sina, 1988. 
 A Comparison of Religions: Vedism, Abrahamism, and Hinduism. Cairo: Ibn Sina Bookshop, 1996. 
 Philosophy of Christian Creeds. Cairo: Dar Kibaa, 1998. 
 Introduction to the Philosophy of Religion. Cairo, Dar Kibaa, 2001. 
 Revelation Has Other Meanings. Cairo: Culture Palaces Organization, 2013 
 Roger Garaudy: Half a Century Search for the Truth. Cairo: Ibn Sina Bookshop, 1986.  	
 Religion and Metaphysics in the Philosophy of Hume, Cairo, Dar Kibaa, 1997. 
 Descartes' Masks. Cairo: Dar Kibaa, 1998. 
 The Reasonable and Unreasonable in Religions. Cairo: Dar Nahdat Misr, 2006. 
 God and Man: The Problem of Similarity and Difference. Cairo: Dar Kibaa Al Haditha, 2006. 
 Islam, Positivism and Orientalism in the Age of Ideology. Cairo: Dar Nahdat Misr, 2007. 
 Rationalism and Fanaticism. Cairo: Dar Nahdat Misr, 2007. 
 Metaphysics: Critical Readings. Cairo: Dar Al Thakafah Al Arabayya, 2009. 
 Modern Philosophy: New Readings. Cairo: Dar Al Thakafah Al Arabayya, 8th Edition, 2009.

Political Field
 The Future of Arab-Israeli Conflict and Strategies of Establishing A Palestinian Statehood. Cairo: Dar Kibaa, 2001. 
 Hegel’s Civil Society. Cairo: Dar Kibaa, 2002.  
 Civil Society and the State. Cairo: Nahdat Misr, 2006.  
 The Philosophy of Citizenship and the Foundations of the Modern State. Cairo, General Authority for Cultural Palaces, 2004.

Social Field
 Ethics of Progress. Cairo: General Authority for Cultural Palaces, 2004. 
 Rumors. Cairo: Ibn Sina Bookshop, 1996.

Academic Research
 The Art of Writing Academic Research and Theses. Cairo, Ibn Sina Bookshop, 1990. 
 How to Write an Academic Research Paper. Cairo: Nahdat Misr, 2007. 
 Research Methods. Beirut: Dar Al-Amir, 2010.

Jurisprudent Sciences
 The Jurisprudent Guide. Cairo Ibn Sina Bookshop, 1984. 
 The Farewell Pilgrimage. Cairo, Al- Mokhtar Al-Islami Bookshop, 1985. 
 Keys to the Science of Hadith. Al-Qur'an Bookshop, 1987.  
 Inimitability of Quran: New Interpretation of Almighty God’s Words “And the Male is Not Like the Female.” Cairo, Al-Qur'an Bookshop, 1985. 
 Muslim Woman’s Fatawa in Worships and Dealings. Cairo, Al-Qur'an Bookshop, 1987. 
 Women’s Jurisprudence in Light of Jurisprudential Schools and Contemporary Independent Reasoning. Syria, Dar Elkitab El-Arabi, 1990.

See also
 List of Egyptian authors
 List of African writers
Education in Egypt
Egyptian universities
List of Egyptian universities
Cairo University alumni

External links
https://openlibrary.org/b/OL2704463M/Tawahhum
 Mohamed Osman Elkhosht
http://www.domaintools.com/en/Mohamed_Osman_Elkhosht
http://202.160.7.82/cgi-bin/gw/chameleon?sessionid=2008031012361829053&skin=default&lng=en&inst=consortium&conf=.%2Fchameleon.conf&host=202.160.7.81%2B2222%2BDEFAULT&search=SCAN&SourceScreen=CARDSCR&elementcount=1&t1=al-Khalidi,%20Isma'il%20'Abd%20al-'Aziz%20&u1=1003&rootsearch=SCAN&function=PREVPAGE&pos=1&pagingt=%01150599&beginsrch=&usersrch
 jstor
 openlibrary
 bustanbooks
 comment
http://books.google.com.eg/books?id=Zt8I2GwVZs8C&pg=PA7&lpg=PA7&dq="alkhasht"&source=bl&ots=cxQq_vz_Hu&sig=HfctQbRZA8M4n5paIkNKmJm_0S0&hl=en&ei=uZH4SZ7KFaSRjAfz1bHIDA&sa=X&oi=book_result&ct=result&resnum=3

1964 births
Living people
Academic staff of Cairo University
Egyptian philosophers